Germain's peacock-pheasant (Polyplectron germaini) is a pheasant that is endemic to Indochina. The name commemorates the French colonial army's veterinary surgeon Louis Rodolphe Germain.

Description
The bird is a medium-sized, approximately 60 cm long, brownish dark pheasant with finely spotted buff, short crest, bare red facial skin, brown iris and purplish-blue ocelli on upperbody plumage and half of its tail of twenty feathers. Both sexes are similar. The female has eighteen tail feathers and is smaller than male.

Taxonomy
The phylogeny of this species is somewhat enigmatic. mtDNA cytochrome b and D-loop as well as the nuclear ovomucoid intron G data confirms that it belongs to a clade together with the grey peacock-pheasant, but also the "brown" southernly species bronze-tailed peacock-pheasant and mountain peacock-pheasant. Biogeography suggests that it may indeed be the most ancient form in its clade, speciating parapatrically or peripatrically in Cochinchina (Kimball et al. 2001). This probably took place in the Late Pliocene, roughly 4-3 mya.

Distribution and habitat
The Germain's peacock-pheasant is endemic to southern Indochina. It is found in the seasonal tropical forests of mid-southern Vietnam and far eastern Cambodia; it can be found readily in Cat Tien National Park. The female usually lays two creamy-white eggs.

Status and conservation
Due to ongoing habitat loss and limited range, the Germain's peacock-pheasant is evaluated as Near Threatened on the IUCN Red List of Threatened Species. It is listed on Appendix II of CITES.

References 

Kimball, Rebecca T.; Braun, Edward L.; Ligon, J. David; Lucchini, Vittorio & Randi, Ettore (2001): A molecular phylogeny of the peacock-pheasants (Galliformes: Polyplectron spp.) indicates loss and reduction of ornamental traits and display behaviours. Biol. J. Linn. Soc. 73(2): 187–198. HTML abstract

External links 
 ARKive - images and movies of the Germain's peacock-pheasant (Polyplectron germaini)
 BirdLife Species Factsheet
 Red Data Book

Germain's peacock-pheasant
Birds of Vietnam
Near threatened animals
Near threatened biota of Asia
Germain's peacock-pheasant